Sennheiser electronic GmbH & Co. KG is a German privately held audio company specializing in the design and production of a wide range of high-fidelity products, including microphones, headphones, and headsets for personal, professional, and business applications. The company's head office is located in Wedemark, near Hanover, and the company is represented in more than 50 countries worldwide.

The German company was founded in 1945 by Fritz Sennheiser and is still an independent family business. Since 2013, Daniel Sennheiser and Andreas Sennheiser have been co-CEOs. They are the third generation of the Sennheiser family to lead the company. According to its own figures, the Sennheiser Group has around 2,801 employees worldwide. In 2019, the total turnover amounted to €756.7 million.

History

The company was founded in 1945, just a few weeks after the end of World War II by Fritz Sennheiser (1912–2010) and seven fellow engineers of the University of Hannover in a laboratory called Laboratorium Wennebostel (shortened, "Labor W"). The laboratory was named after the village of Wennebostel in the municipality of Wedemark to where it had been moved due to the war. Its first product was a voltmeter. Lab W began building microphones in 1946 with the DM1, and began developing them in 1947 with the DM2. By 1955, the company had 250 employees, and had begun production of many products, including geophysical equipment, the noise-compensated microphones (DM4), microphone transformers, mixers, and miniature magnetic headphones. Labor W was renamed Sennheiser electronic in 1958.

In the late 1950s to early 1960s, Sennheiser met Thomas Schillinger, who was tasked with starting Sennheiser's presence in the United States. Sennheiser was transformed into a limited partnership (KG) in 1973. In 1980, the company entered the aviation market, supplying Lufthansa with headsets. The company began producing modern wireless microphones in 1982, the same year founder Fritz Sennheiser handed the management of the company over to his son, Jörg Sennheiser. In 1987, Sennheiser was awarded at the 59th Academy Awards for its MKH 816 shotgun microphone.

Also in 1991, Georg Neumann GmbH, Berlin, which builds studio microphones, became a part of Sennheiser.

In 2003, Sennheiser entered into a joint venture with Danish company, William-Demant-Holding, a specialist in hearing aids, diagnostic technology, and personal communication. Sennheiser Communications A/S was founded.

In 2005, Sennheiser acquired speaker manufacturer Klein + Hummel.

Daniel Sennheiser, grandson of the founder, joined the company in 2008. In 2010, his brother Andreas Sennheiser also did so. Both are shareholders of the company.

On July 1, 2013, Daniel and Andreas Sennheiser were promoted to the position of CEO, responsible for Sennheiser electronic GmbH & Co. KG.

In 2014, Sennheiser founded the new subsidiary Sennheiser Streaming Technology GmbH (SST), which develops streaming solutions for software and hardware.

In 2019, Sennheiser acquired a majority stake in Dear Reality, a company that specializes in spatial audio algorithms and VR/AR audio software.

In 2021, Sennheiser sold its consumer audio division to Swiss-based hearing-aid manufacturer Sonova Group.

Locations
Sennheiser is headquartered in the municipality of Wedemark, Germany (near Hannover). Its United States headquarters are located in Old Lyme, Connecticut. The company has factories in Wennebostel (Wedemark, near Hannover); Tullamore, Ireland (since 1990); Albuquerque, New Mexico (since 2000), and Brașov, Romania (since 2019). Some consumer products are made in China. Sennheiser's R&D facilities are located in Germany, Denmark, Switzerland, Singapore, and San Francisco, California.

Sennheiser has a total of 21 sales subsidiaries and trading partners and is active in more than 50 countries. The company opened its first Sennheiser store in 2016 to make products accessible to customers. Sennheiser now has seven stores in Berlin, San Francisco, Singapore, Kuala Lumpur, Mexico City, and Sydney and at its headquarters in Wedemark. In 2016, a temporary store was located in New York City.

Products 

Sennheiser developed the directional microphone model MD 421 in 1960; this microphone was quickly adopted for professional broadcasting applications, music recording studios, and live concert performances. The MD 421 is an industry standard; more than 500,000 units have been produced.

Sennheiser was mainly known for its consumer headphones and professional headphones and microphones, such as the MKH 416 short shotgun, which came to be the Hollywood standard shotgun microphone; and the 816, similar in design with longer reach. It also makes the Orpheus headphone set; wireless microphones; aviation, multimedia and gaming headsets; micro-Hifi systems; conferencing systems; speakers; and amplifiers.

Sennheiser consisted of two independent business units - its consumer division and the professional audio division. The consumer division produced a range of headphones and home-entertainment speakers. The professional audio division produces products for live music, DJing, theater, studio, broadcast, film, and video, as well as three-dimensional (3D) audio and AR/VR/XR. It also includes solutions for business communication, such as presentations, conferences, meetings, visitor guidance, hearing support, and the education sector.

CEOs

Andreas Sennheiser is a German business executive, known for serving as chief executive officer of Sennheiser. He took over as CEO along with his brother Daniel Sennheiser on July 1, 2013. Andreas was born in 1974 in Zurich, and earned a doctorate in supply-chain management from the Swiss Federal Institute of Technology in Zurich in 2004. Sennheiser electronic was founded by his grandfather, Fritz Sennheiser, and he joined the family business with his brother Daniel. In 2013, both Daniel and Andreas were promoted to the position of CEO. Andreas focused on gaming handsets and affordable wireless headphones including Sennheiser PC350. Along with his brother Daniel, they entered the music business in 2014.

Research and development

Overview

Sennheiser has four research and development sites in Germany, Switzerland, the US, and Singapore. In addition, the Innovation Campus in Wennebostel opened in 2015 with 7,000 m2 of space. The company invested 60.5 million euros in research and development in 2018.

AMBEO 3D Audio

The AMBEO technology program is supposed to cover immersive audio products and activities from recording through processing and mixing to playback. According to the company, the technology is applicable in areas such as realistic live concert broadcasts, sports broadcasting, 3D recordings, exhibition installations, VR/AR/XR applications, and 3D audio for the home.

Sennheiser has been recording 9.1 music since 2010 and has developed an upmix algorithm that generates 9.1 music from conventional stereo recordings. The AMBEO Music Blueprints provide information about the recording, mixing, and playback of live music in 3D audio. The first AMBEO product to be introduced in 2016 was the AMBEO VR Mic for professional VR/AR/XR sound recording. Sennheiser created the first augmented audio listening accessory for Magic Leap’s AR/VR goggles, the AMBEO AR One.

See also
List of microphone manufacturers

References

External links

 

Audio equipment manufacturers of Germany
Headphones manufacturers
Microphone manufacturers
Electronics companies established in 1945
German brands
Companies based in Lower Saxony
1945 establishments in Germany
Hanover Region